Mo Yingfeng (19 January 1938 – 17 February 1989) was a Chinese novelist who was the director of China Writers Association. Mo served as the vice president of Hunan Writers Association and Hunan Literature and Art Association.

Biography
Mo was born in Yiyang, Hunan in 1938. He entered Hubei Arts College in 1956, majoring in music at the Department of Music.

In 1961, Mo joined the People's Liberation Army, then he worked in Guangzhou Military Region.

In 1970, Mo was transferred from Guangzhou to Changsha.

Mo started to publish works in 1972. In 1978, Mo worked in Xiaoxiang Film Studio as an editor.

In February 1989, Mo died of an illness in Changsha.

Works

Novels
 General's Chant
 The Wind
 The Soldier Rush Through the Mountains
 The Goddess of Love

Awards
 General's Chant – 1st Mao Dun Literature Prize (1982)

Personal life
Mo was twice married. He had two daughters with his former wife Li Mingxiu, Mo Zhuwei and Mo Zhuqin. His second wife was Ouyang Huiling. His two daughters, their husbands, and five grandchildren live in Australia.

References

1938 births
1989 deaths
People from Yiyang
Writers from Hunan
20th-century novelists
Mao Dun Literature Prize laureates
Chinese male novelists
20th-century Chinese male writers